Aeolotrocha is a genus of moth in the family Gelechiidae.

Species
 Aeolotrocha delograpta Janse, 1960
 Aeolotrocha generosa Meyrick, 1921
 Aeolotrocha paroptila Janse, 1960
 Aeolotrocha phaeoptera Janse, 1960

References

 
Gelechiinae
Taxa named by Edward Meyrick
Moth genera